GreenButton was a New Zealandbased software firm. The company specialized in moving independent software vendors (ISVs) and enterprises to cloud computing. Founded in 2006, GreenButton was based in Wellington, New Zealand, with additional offices in Palo Alto, California, and Seattle. 
GreenButton was acquired by Microsoft on 2 May 2014; its technologies were integrated into its Azure service.

History 

GreenButton was founded as InterGrid in 2006 in Wellington, New Zealand, to provide small-scale customers access to job processors. 
The company helped software vendors use cloud computing, offering a service called GreenButton in July 2010.

In 2011, the company was renamed to GreenButton, and they had joined the Microsoft Partner Network. In 2011, GreenButton was declared as Microsoft Corp's Windows Azure ISV Partner of the Year. They won the 2011 New Zealand Partner of the Year Award from Microsoft New Zealand. 
In May 2011, GreenButton entered into an alliance with Microsoft.
It included an investment reported at more than US$1 million, and adding Mark Canepa to its board of directors.
GreenButton won BizSpark Partner of the Year and Software Exporter of the Year awards from MS New Zealand in 2011. Dave Fellows of GreenButton won the Solutions Architect of the Year award that year.

In December 2011, GreenButton opened two offices in the United States. The office at Palo Alto, California, functioned as the US headquarters. The second was as a sales office in Seattle. 
GreenButton was finalists for the New Zealand Hi-Tech awards.
The company had a total turnover of $1.5 million for the fiscal year 2011–12.

GreenButton partnered with the Pixar Animation Studios and the Microsoft's cloud computing platform Windows Azure, on a rendering service for RenderMan image generating software announced in January 2012. The service enhances the RenderMan Interface Specification.

In June 2012, GreenButton announced a partnership with the GNS Science of New Zealand and American based Stillwater Group for cloud computing during seismic processing. The company promoted software which integrated seismic processing to the Amazon Web Services (AWS) cloud service. Seismic processing is part of the oil and natural gas exploration process, and requires heavy processing of data.
In 2012 GreenButton entered into a partnership with Numerix, an American company that develops software for risk analysis of financial derivatives.
It won an award at the 2012 Wellington Gold awards.

On 2 May 2014, GreenButton announced its acquisition by Microsoft with its technology integrated into Microsoft Azure. GreenButton stopped accepting new customers on the same day.

After its acquisition GreenButton now operates under Microsoft Azure product line as Azure Batch.

References

External links 
 

Microsoft acquisitions
Cloud infrastructure
Cloud computing providers
Cloud platforms
Cloud storage
Defunct software companies of New Zealand